Nellie, the Beautiful Cloak Model is a 1924 American silent drama film directed by Emmett J. Flynn and starring Claire Windsor. Produced and distributed by Goldwyn Pictures, the film is based on a play by Owen Davis, which premiered on Broadway in 1906.

Plot
As described in a film magazine review, ill used by her father, Nellie is taken in charge by Thomas Lipton and brought up in poor surroundings. When Thomas dies, she becomes a cloak model. She is continuously persecuted by her mother's nephew Walter Peck, the owner of the shop on Fifth Avenue where she works. He endeavors to get rid of her so that he can obtain a fortune to which she is the heiress. After many adventures, including her rescue from crushed by an elevated train by Jack Carroll, the man she loves, the young woman finds happiness.

Cast

Preservation status
A copy is held in Russia by the Gosfilmofond Russian State Archive.

References

External links

Lobby poster
Stills at www.silentfilmstillarchive.com
Lantern slide, posters, stills, and other material at the Claire Windsor website
Lobby card at www.gettyimages.com
Copyright synopsis at the Library of Congress

1924 films
American silent feature films
Goldwyn Pictures films
Films directed by Emmett J. Flynn
American films based on plays
Silent American drama films
1924 drama films
1920s American films
1920s English-language films